Heteroparasitus is a genus of mites in the family Parasitidae.

Species
 Heteroparasitus athiasae Juvara Bals, 2002     
 Heteroparasitus coronarius (Karg, 1971)     
 Heteroparasitus tirolensis (Sellnick, 1968)

References

Parasitidae